Anton Novikaw (born 26 April 1995) is a Belarusian former professional footballer.

External links

1995 births
Living people
Belarusian footballers
Association football defenders
FC Belshina Bobruisk players
FC Energetik-BGU Minsk players
FC Chist players